Wilhelmina Sherriff Bain (5 September 1848 – 26 January 1944) was a New Zealand teacher, librarian, feminist, peace activist and writer.

Early life 
Sheriff Bain was born in Midlothian, near Edinburgh, Scotland, to John and Elizabeth Middlemass Bain. She had six siblings, one of whom, James Walker Bain, emigrated to Invercargill, New Zealand. Sheriff Bain, her parents and the remaining siblings followed him, travelling on the Gloucester and arriving in 1858.

Career 
Sheriff Bain became a teacher in 1879 and was a strong campaigner for equality for women teachers, who were often paid half the salary of male teachers. In 1894 her father died and she moved to Christchurch, where she worked as a librarian and joined the Canterbury Women's Institute. She became the president, and in this role chaired the first meeting of the National Council of Women in 1896. Kate Sheppard was appointed the president of the council, Ada Wells secretary and Sheriff Bain treasurer.

She was a passionate advocate for peace and arbitration, and presented a number of papers on these topics at conventions and meetings. She was particularly opposed to the Boer War and in 1900 delivered a strong anti-war speech at the conference of the National Council of Women. Newspaper editors disliked her opinions and the NCW distanced itself from her stance in order to avoid negative publicity.

In 1899 Sheriff Bain moved to Auckland, where she taught at Queen Victoria School for Maori Girls, and then to Taranaki in 1902. In 1901 she was elected New Zealand's representative on the International Council of Women's standing committee on peace and arbitration, and in 1904 attended the ICW meeting in Berlin, followed by the Thirteenth Universal Peace and Arbitration Congress in Boston, U.S.

From 1909 to 1913, Sheriff Bain lived in Riverton and worked as a journalist. She campaigned against compulsory military training, which New Zealand had introduced in 1909, and organised the Aparima Peace Union and, in Invercargill, the Women's Peace Society. She was also interested in issues of gender equality, equal pay, women jurors, prison reform and workers' rights.

In her 70s, Sheriff Bain had two books published in England: an anthology of poems, From Zealandia, and a novel, Service: a New Zealand story.

Sheriff Bain died in Auckland aged 95 on 26 January 1944.

Personal life 
Sheriff Bain was engaged to a man in Invercargill, John Clark, however he died before they were married. In 1914, she married a storekeeper, Robert Elliot, who died six years later. Bain took interest in the Baháʼí Faith and was a vegetarianism activist. Bain was an opponent of hunting and vivisection.

References

1848 births
1944 deaths
19th-century New Zealand educators
20th-century New Zealand people
20th-century New Zealand writers
20th-century New Zealand women writers
Anti-vivisectionists
New Zealand activists
New Zealand anti-war activists
New Zealand feminists
New Zealand librarians
New Zealand vegetarianism activists
New Zealand women activists
Scottish emigrants to New Zealand
Women librarians